Local elections were held in  Meycauayan, Bulacan on May 13, 2019 within the Philippine general election in 2019 Bulacan local elections. The voters will elect for the elective local posts in the municipality: the mayor, vice mayor, and ten councilors.

Mayor
Incumbent Mayor Henry Villarica is running for Congressman of 4th district; his wife, Deputy Speaker and Congresswoman Linabelle Villarica will be running for Mayor.

Vice Mayor
Incumbent Vice Mayor Rafael "Jojo" Manzano is term-limited, his party nominates incumbent Councilor Jojie Violago and will run unopposed.

City Council election
Election is via plurality-at-large voting: A voter votes for up to ten candidates, then the ten candidates with the highest number of votes are elected.

|-bgcolor=black
|colspan=25|

References

2019 Philippine local elections
Elections in Meycauayan
May 2019 events in the Philippines
2019 elections in Central Luzon